The Walterboro and Western Railway was a shortline railroad that served South Carolina in the Southeastern United States in the late 19th century.

In 1900 the 26-mile Walterboro and Western joined with the Green Pond, Walterboro and Branchville Railway to form Green Pond, Walterboro and Branchville Railroad.

Within a couple of years it had become a part of the Atlantic Coast Line Railroad.

References

Defunct South Carolina railroads
Railway companies established in 1894
Railway companies disestablished in 1900
Predecessors of the Atlantic Coast Line Railroad
American companies disestablished in 1900
1894 establishments in South Carolina
1900 disestablishments in South Carolina